Operation Dawn also referred as Operation Silent Epic was an operation launched by the Turkish Armed Forces against the PKK, who had taken control of Şemdinli.

Operation details

The operation was launched by the  Turkish Army and backed by the Turkish Air Force and it lasted for 11 days. Remaining PKK officers have been summoned to the Qandil Mountains. On 29 September the government declared Şemdinli is fully controlled by Turkish forces and operations are about to move to other zones. During this operation a female PKK leader called Ader prepared an attack on an outpost that resulted in 9 soldiers killed.

References

History of the Kurdistan Workers' Party
Dawn